The 2001–02 UC Irvine Anteaters men's basketball team represented the University of California, Irvine during the 2001–02 NCAA Division I men's basketball season. The Anteaters were led by 5th year head coach Pat Douglass and played at the Bren Events Center. They were members of the Big West Conference.

Previous season 
The 2000–01 UC Irvine Anteaters men's basketball team finished the season with a record of 25–5 and 15–1 in Big West play. The anteaters won their first regular season conference title in school history and their 25 wins were a school record.

Roster

Schedule

|-
!colspan=9 style=|Regular Season

|-
!colspan=9 style=| Big West tournament

|-
!colspan=9 style=| NIT

Source

Awards and honors
Jerry Green
Honorable Mention AP All-American
Big West Conference Player of the Year
All-Big West First Team
Adam Parada
All-Big West Second Team

Source:

References

UC Irvine Anteaters men's basketball seasons
UC Irvine
UC Irvine Anteaters
UC Irvine Anteaters